The Fire in the Borgo is a painting created by the workshop of the Italian Renaissance artist Raphael between 1514 and 1517. Though it is assumed that Raphael did make the designs for the complex composition, the fresco was most likely painted by his assistant Giulio Romano. The painting was part of Raphael's commission to decorate the rooms that are now known as the Stanze di Raffaello, in the Apostolic Palace in the Vatican. It depicts Pope Leo IV halting a fire in 847 with a benediction from a balcony in front of the Old St. Peter's Basilica. The mural lends its name to the Stanza dell'incendio del Borgo ("The Room of the Fire in the Borgo").

References

Further reading

Raphael rooms
Paintings by Giulio Romano
1514 paintings
Paintings of children